A lemon drop is a vodka-based cocktail that has a lemony, sweet and sour flavor, prepared using lemon juice, triple sec and simple syrup. It has been described as a variant of, or as "a take on", the Vodka Martini, but is in actual fact a closer to a White Lady variant. It is typically prepared and served straight up – chilled with ice and strained.

The drink was invented sometime in the 1970s by Norman Jay Hobday, the founder and proprietor of Henry Africa's bar in San Francisco, California. Some variations of the drink exist, such as blueberry and raspberry lemon drops. It is served at some bars and restaurants in the United States, and in such establishments in other areas of the world.

Overview

A lemon drop is a cocktail with a lemony, sweet and sour flavor, whereby the sweet and sour ingredients serve to contrast and balance one another. It is a vodka-based cocktail that is prepared with the addition of lemon juice, triple sec and simple syrup. Plain or citrus-flavored vodka may be used in its preparation, such as citron vodka. Lemon-flavored vodka is also sometimes used. Lemon juice that has been freshly squeezed may be used, which can produce a superior drink compared to using commercially prepared lemon juice. Some versions are prepared using the juice from Meyer lemons.

Cointreau-brand triple sec is used in some versions, and it may be prepared using a simple syrup that has been infused with lemon juice. Some versions are prepared using sour mix, a cocktail mixer. A garnish of a sliced lemon wheel, wedge, zest, rind or a lemon twist is sometimes used. Additional ingredients may also be used in the drink's preparation, such as ginger syrup and lavender extract.

A lemon drop is typically prepared straight up, meaning that it is shaken or stirred with ice, strained, and served in a stemmed glass, such as a martini glass. The glass may be prepared with a sugared rim, performed by dipping the rim of the glass in water or lemon juice and then dipping it into a rimmer (a shallow tray used in bartending), filled with sugar. Superfine sugar, also called bar sugar or caster sugar may be used.

History
The lemon drop was invented sometime in the 1970s by Norman Jay Hobday, the founder and proprietor of Henry Africa's, a fern bar in the Russian Hill neighborhood of San Francisco, California that opened in 1969. It was originally served in a cocktail glass. The Lemon Drop was most likely named after lemon drop candy. After its invention, the drink swiftly spread to many San Francisco saloons. In the early 1990s, it was often prepared as a shooter or served in a shot glass.

Variations
Variations of the drink include lemon drops prepared with blueberries and raspberries, which may use vodkas or other liquors flavored with these respective berries. These drinks may also be served or garnished with these berries, or with lemon. A blueberry lemon drop may be prepared with muddled blueberries, and a raspberry lemon drop may be prepared with puréed or crushed raspberries.

The glass may have a sugared rim, and colored sugar may be used, prepared by adding food coloring to the sugar.

The "lemon drop shot" is a popular variant made with 2 parts vodka, 1 part lemon juice, 1/2 ounce of simple syrup, and served in a shot glass garnished with a sugar coated rim and lemon slice.

In popular culture
In 2006, preparation of the lemon drop was presented on The Oprah Winfrey Show, prepared by Oprah Winfrey and Rachael Ray. The drink's popularity increased during this time.

See also

 Lemon liqueur
 List of cocktails
 List of lemon dishes and beverages
 Moon River – a similar cocktail prepared with gin

References

Further reading

External links

 Lemon Drop Martini Recipe . About.com.

Cocktails with vodka
Lemon drinks
Cocktails with lemon juice
Cocktails with triple sec or curaçao
Three-ingredient cocktails